James MacLaren may refer to:

 James Maclaren (1818–1892), early settler and entrepreneur in western Quebec
 James Roland MacLaren (1839–1912), British actor and playwright
 James MacLaren (architect) (1853–1890), Scottish architect
 James MacLaren (cricketer) (1870–1952), English cricketer
 Jim MacLaren (1963–2010), American motivational speaker and author

See also
James McLaren (disambiguation)